Hotel Bristol Palace is  a 4-star Luxury hotel in Genoa, Italy on Via XX Settembre.

History 
The hotel was designed by Dario Carbone and built in 1905.

During World War 2, it housed the German command. At the end of the war, it housed the National Liberation Committee.

The hotel has hosted famous and notable guests such as the Emperor of Japan Hirohito and the writers Edmondo De Amicis, Luigi Pirandello and Gabriele D'Annunzio. In 1926, Alfred Hitchcock stayed in the hotel during the filming The Pleasure Garden.

The hotel is managed by Gruppo Duetorrihotels Spa.

Gallery

References

External links 
 Official web site

Hotels in Genoa
Hotels in Italy
Hotels established in 1905
Hotel buildings completed in 1905
1905 establishments in Italy